Viscount Exmouth, of Canonteign in the County of Devon, is a title in the Peerage of the United Kingdom.

History
The title was created in 1816 for the prominent naval officer Edward Pellew, 1st Baron Exmouth. He had already been created a baronet in the Baronetage of Great Britain on 18 March 1796 for rescuing the crew of the East Indiaman Dutton. After a succession of commands culminating as Commander of the Mediterranean Fleet, he was created Baron Exmouth, of Canonteign in the County of Devon, in the Peerage of the United Kingdom in 1814. He was created a Viscount, with the same designation, for the successful bombardment of Algiers in 1816, which secured the release of the 1,000 Christian slaves in the city.

He was succeeded by his eldest son, the second Viscount, who represented Launceston in Parliament. On the death in 1922 of the second Viscount's great-grandson, the fifth Viscount, this line of the family failed. He was succeeded by his 94-year-old first cousin twice removed, the sixth Viscount. He was the son of the Very Reverend and Hon. George Pellew, Dean of Norwich, third son of the first Viscount. Partly due to having become a U.S. citizen, and partly due to his advanced age, the sixth Viscount did not use his title for the brief period he held it, nor did he claim his seat in the House of Lords. Only six months after succeeding to his titles, the sixth Viscount died. He was succeeded by his son, the seventh Viscount, a naturalised U.S. citizen and professor of chemistry. Having succeeded to the peerage, the seventh Viscount returned to England in 1923 and again became a British subject, taking his seat in the House of Lords in 1931. Upon his death without any surviving issue in 1945, this line of the family also failed.

The title then passed to the seventh Viscount's second cousin, the eighth Viscount. He was the grandson of the Reverend and Hon. Edward Pellew, fourth son of the first Viscount. His son, the ninth Viscount, married María Luisa de Urquijo y Losada, a title of Spanish nobility that was created by King Philip IV in 1652. They were succeeded in their respective titles by their son, Paul Pellew, as 10th Viscount Exmouth and 9th Marquess of Olías.

The family seat was Canonteign House, near Exeter in Devon.

Baron Exmouth (1814)
Edward Pellew, 1st Baron Exmouth (1757–1833), created Viscount Exmouth in 1816

Viscount Exmouth (1816)
Edward Pellew, 1st Viscount Exmouth (1757–1833)
Pownoll Pellew, 2nd Viscount Exmouth (1786–1833)
Edward Pellew, 3rd Viscount Exmouth (1811–1876)
Edward Fleetwood John Pellew, 4th Viscount Exmouth (1861–1899)
Edward Addington Hargreaves Pellew, 5th Viscount Exmouth (1890–1922)
Henry Edward Pellew, 6th Viscount Exmouth (1828–1923)
Charles E. Pellew, 7th Viscount Exmouth (1863–1945)
Edward Irving Pownoll Pellew, 8th Viscount Exmouth (1868–1951)
Pownoll Irving Edward Pellew, 9th Viscount Exmouth (1908–1970)
Paul Pellew, 10th Viscount Exmouth (born 1940)

The heir apparent is the present holder's son, the Hon. Edward Francis Pellew (born 1978).

Male-line family tree

Line of succession

  Edward Pellew, 1st Viscount Exmouth (1757–1833)
Rev. Hon. Edward William Pellew (1799–1869)
Pownoll William Pellew (1837–1872)
 Edward Irving Pownoll Pellew, 8th Viscount Exmouth (1868–1951)
 Pownoll Irving Edward Pellew, 9th Viscount Exmouth (1908–1970)
 Paul Edward Pellew, 10th Viscount Exmouth (born 1940)
(1) Hon. Edward Francis Pellew (born 1978)
(2) Hon. Alexander Paul Pellew (born 1978)
(3) Hon. Peter Irving Pellew (born 1942)
Fleetwood Hugo Pellew (1838–1906)
Fleetwood Hugo Pellew (1871–1961)
Anthony Pownoll Pellew (1911–1992)
(4) Mark Edward Pellew (born 1942)
(5) Adam Lee Pellew (born 1966)
(6) Dominic Stephen Pellew (born 1968)
(7) Robert Anthony Pellew (born 1945)
 (8) Toby James Pownoll Pellew (born 1982)
(9) Nicholas Charles Pellew (born 1959)
(10) Christopher Anthony Lloyd Pellew (born 1992)
(11) Philip Esmond Pellew (born 1962)
Myles Addington Pellew (1919–2017)
(12) Simon Du Pre Pellew (born 1959)
(13) Dominic Pellew (born 1997)
(14) Timothy Winthrop Pellew (born 1921)
(15) Fleetwood Timothy Pellew (born 1952)
(16) Adrian Harold Pellew (born 1954)
(17) Adam Timothy Edmund Pellew (born 2000)
(18) Owen Simon Pellew (born 1958)
(19) Colin David Pellew (born 1961)

Arms

References

Sources

Kidd, Charles, Williamson, David (editors). Debrett's Peerage and Baronetage (1990 edition). New York: St Martin's Press, 1990.

External links

Viscountcies in the Peerage of the United Kingdom
Noble titles created in 1816
Noble titles created for UK MPs
1816 establishments in the United Kingdom